Jiří Marušák (born 29 November 1975) is Czech former professional ice hockey defenceman.

Marušák played in the Czech Extraliga for HC Zlín, BK Mladá Boleslav, HC Plzeň and HC Pardubice. He also played in the SM-liiga for Tappara, the Elitserien for Djurgårdens IF and in the Russian Superleague and its successor the Kontinental Hockey League for Metallurg Novokuznetsk, SKA Saint Petersburg, HC CSKA Moscow and HC MVD.

References

External links

1975 births
Living people
HC CSKA Moscow players
Czech ice hockey defencemen
Djurgårdens IF Hockey players
HC Dynamo Pardubice players
LHK Jestřábi Prostějov players
Metallurg Novokuznetsk players
BK Mladá Boleslav players
HC MVD players
HC Plzeň players
Sportspeople from Zlín
SKA Saint Petersburg players
Tappara players
HC Vítkovice players
PSG Berani Zlín players
Czechoslovak ice hockey defencemen
Czech expatriate ice hockey players in Sweden
Czech expatriate ice hockey players in Finland
Czech expatriate ice hockey players in Russia